When the Daltons Rode is a 1940 American Western film directed by George Marshall and starring Randolph Scott, Kay Francis and Brian Donlevy. Based on the 1931 book of the same name by Emmett Dalton, a member of the Dalton Gang, and Jack Jungmeyer Sr., the film also includes a fictional family friend who tries to dissuade the Dalton brothers from becoming outlaws.

Plot
The Dalton brothers, law-abiding farmers, move to Kansas from Missouri to begin a new life. Bob Dalton meets lawyer Tod Jackson and persuades him to defend his kin Ben Dalton in a court case against a corrupt land-development company.

A melee erupts during the trial and the Daltons shoot their way out of the courtroom. Cronies of the land developers and the press portray the brothers negatively. Ben is shot in the back. Unable to live lawfully, the Daltons rob a stagecoach and their reputation as dangerous outlaws spreads.

Tod has fallen in love with Bob Dalton's fiancée Julie. He urges the Daltons to change their ways, but they defy him and pull one more bank job in Kansas. Bob and Grat are killed there, as are two other members of the gang, but Emmett survives.

Cast
 Randolph Scott as Tod Jackson
 Kay Francis as Julie King
 Brian Donlevy as Grat Dalton
 George Bancroft as Caleb Winters
 Broderick Crawford as Bob Dalton
 Stuart Erwin as Ben Dalton
 Andy Devine as Ozark Jones
 Frank Albertson as Emmett Dalton
 Mary Gordon as Ma Dalton
 Harvey Stephens as Rigby
 Edgar Dearing as Sheriff
 Quen Ramsey as Clem Wilson
 Dorothy Granger as Nancy
 Robert McKenzie as Photographer
 Fay McKenzie as Hannah
 Walter Soderling as Judge Lucius Thorndown (Judge Swain in the credits)
 Mary Ainslee as Minnie
 Erville Alderson as Dist. Atty. Wade
 Sally Payne as Annabella
 Edgar Buchanan as Old Timer (uncredited)
 June Wilkins as Suzy

Production
The film was based on Emmett Dalton's autobiography. Universal announced the project in March 1940 with filming to begin in May. Stuart Anthony and Lester Cole worked on the script. The railroad scenes were filmed on the Sierra Railroad in Tuolumne County, California.

References

External links
 
 
 

1940 films
1940 Western (genre) films
American black-and-white films
Films directed by George Marshall
American Western (genre) films
Films scored by Frank Skinner
Universal Pictures films
1940s American films